The 2012–13 National First Division was played from September 2012 until May 2013, and is the second tier of South Africa's professional football. Polokwane City won the league, earning promotion to the 2013–14 South African Premier Division. Santos and Mpumalanga Black Aces finished second and third respectively, qualifying for the 2012–13 PSL Playoff Tournament, which Mpumalanga Black Aces won, also earning them promotion to the 2013–14 South African Premier Division.

Clubs played a varying number of games over the course of the season due to a number of boycotts which took place at the beginning of the season.

League table

References

External links
PSL.co.za

National First Division seasons
South
2012–13 in South African soccer leagues